Okcheon County (Okcheon-gun) is a county in North Chungcheong Province, South Korea.

Climate
Okcheon has a humid continental climate (Köppen: Dwa), but can be considered a borderline humid subtropical climate (Köppen: Cwa) using the  isotherm.

Twin towns – sister cities
Okcheon is twinned with:

  Gonohe, Aomori, Japan

Prominent individuals
Jeong Ji-yong, modernist poet
 Song Si-yeol, Joseon statesman, Neo-Confucian scholar and philosopher
Yuk Young-soo First Lady of Korea, killed during an assassination attempt on her husband, Park Chung-hee
Mijoo, member of K-pop girl group Lovelyz
Keum Donghyun, member of K-pop boy group Epex

References

External links
Okcheon County government home page

 
Counties of North Chungcheong Province